A water deity is a deity in mythology associated with water or various bodies of water. Water deities are common in mythology and were usually more important among civilizations in which the sea or ocean, or a great river was more important. Another important focus of worship of water deities has been springs or holy wells.

As a form of animal worship, whales and snakes (hence dragons) have been regarded as godly deities throughout the world (as are other animals such as turtles, fish, crabs, and sharks). In Asian lore, whales and dragons sometimes have connections. Serpents are also common as a symbol or as serpentine deities, sharing many similarities with dragons.

Africa and the Mediterranean

Sub-Sahara Africa

Western Niger-Congo  
Benin
 Ezili, goddess of sweet water, beauty, and love.

Dogon
Nommos, amphibious spirits that are worshiped as ancestors.

Serer
Mindiss (or Mindis) is not a deity in Serer religion, but a pangool with goddess–like attributes. She is a female protector of the Fatick Region. Offerings are made in her name at the River Sine. She appears to humans in the form of a manatee, She is one of the best known fangool (singular of pangool). She possess the attributes of a typical water fangool, yet at the same time, she is a blood fangool.<ref>Gravrand, Henry, La Civilisation Sereer – Pangool, vol.2, Les Nouvelles Editions Africaines du Senegal, (1990), p. 327, </ref> The Senegalese Ministry of Culture added the Mbind Ngo Mindiss site to its list of monuments and historic sites in Fatick. It is the site where offerings are made, situated on the arms of the sea which bears her name, in the Sine.

Yoruba
 Oshun, a orisha of fresh “sweet” waters and the Osun River.
 Olokun, an ocean orisha and is the owner of all waters.
 Yemoja, originally only the orisha of the Ogun River but became orisha over the sea waves by way of the Trans-Atlantic Slave Trade.
Olosa, wife of Olokun, orisha over lagoons.
Oya, orisha of storms and the Niger River.
Oba, orisha of the Oba River.
Yewa, orisha of the Yewa River.
Otín, orisha of the Otín River.
Yemoo, original wife of Obatala and orisha over waters and maternity. Said to be the original form of most female water orishas 

Lugandan 
 Sezibwa, goddess of the Sezibwa River.

Batonga
 Nyami Nyami, a river spirit of the Batonga of Zambia and Zimbabwe.

Kongo
 Bunzi, goddess of rain, rainbow and waters. 
 Chicamassichinuinji, king of oceans. 
 Funza, goddess of waters, twin phenomenon and malformations in children. Wife of Mbumba.
 Kalunga, god of death and border between world of Alives and world of dead. 
 Kimbazi, goddess of sea storms.
 Kuitikuiti, serpent god of Congo river. 
 Lusunzi, god of spring and waters.
 Mamba Muntu, goddesses of waters and sexuality. 
 Makanga.
 Mbantilanda.
 Mbumba, rainbow serpent of terrestrial waters and warriors.
 Mboze.
 Mpulu Bunzi, god of rain and waters.
 Simbi dia Maza, nymphs or goddesses of waters, lakes and rivers.

 Mediterranean Hamito-Semitic regions of North Africa, Arabia, and the Levant. Canaanite 
 Yam (god), god of the sea.

 Egyptian 
Anuket, goddess of the Nile and nourisher of the fields.
Bairthy, goddess of water, was depicted with a small pitcher on her head, holding a long spear-like sceptre.
Hapi, god of the annual flooding of the Nile.
Khnum, god of the source of the Nile. 
Nephthys, goddess of rivers, death, mourning, the dead, and night.
Nu, uncreated god, personification of the primordial waters.
Osiris, god of the dead and afterlife; originally a god of water and vegetation.
Satet, goddess of the Nile River's floods.
Sobek, god of the Nile river, is depicted as a crocodile or a man with the head of a crocodile.
Tefnut, goddess of water, moisture, and fertility.
Wadj-wer, personification of the Mediterranean Sea or represented the lagoons and lakes in the northernmost Nile Delta.

 Hebrew 
 Leviathan, sea serpent.

 Mesopotamian 
 Abzu, god of fresh water, father of all other gods.
 Enbilulu, god of rivers and canals.
 Enki, god of water and of the river Tigris.
 Marduk, god associated with water, vegetation, judgment, and magic.
 Nammu, goddess of the primeval sea.
 Nanshe, goddess of the Persian Gulf, justice, prophecy, fertility and fishing.
 Tiamat, goddess of salt water and chaos, also mother of all gods.
 Sirsir, god of mariners.

 Greek / Hellenic 

 Achelous, Greek river god.
 Aegaeon, god of violent sea storms and ally of the Titans.
Alpheus, river god in Arcadia.
 Amphitrite, sea goddess and consort of Poseidon and thus queen of the sea.
 Anapos, water god of eastern Sicily.
 Asopus, river god in Greece
 Asterion, river-god of Argos
 Brito-Martis, the goddess Brito-Martis is always depicted in arms.
 Brizo, goddess of sailors.
 Carcinus, a giant crab who allied itself with the Hydra against Heracles. When it died, Hera placed it in the sky as the constellation Cancer.
 Ceto, goddess of the dangers of the ocean and of sea monsters.
 Charybdis, a sea monster and spirit of whirlpools and the tide.
 Cymopoleia, a daughter of Poseidon and goddess of giant storm waves.
 Doris, goddess of the sea's bounty and wife of Nereus.
 Eidothea, prophetic sea nymph and daughter of Proteus.
 Electra, an Oceanid, consort of Thaumas.
 Enipeus, a river god
 Eurybia, goddess of the mastery of the seas.
Galene (Γαλήνη), goddess of calm seas.
 Glaucus, the fisherman's sea god.
 Gorgons, three monstrous sea spirits.
 Euryale
 Medusa
 Stheno
 The Graeae, three ancient sea spirits who personified the white foam of the sea; they shared one eye and one tooth between them.
 Hippocampi, the horses of the sea.
 The Ichthyocentaurs, a pair of centaurine sea-gods with the upper bodies of men, the lower fore-parts of horses, ending in the serpentine tails of fish.
Kymopoleia, daughter of Poseidon and goddess of violent sea storms.
 Leucothea, a sea goddess who aided sailors in distress.
 Nerites, watery consort of Aphrodite and/or beloved of Poseidon.
 Nereus, the old man of the sea, and the god of the sea's rich bounty of fish.
 Nymphs
 Naiades, freshwater nymphs.
 Nereides, sea nymphs.
 Oceanides, nymphs of freshwater sources.
 Oceanus, Titan god of the Earth-encircling river Okeanos, the font of all the Earth's fresh water.
 Palaemon, a young sea god who aided sailors in distress.
 Phorcys, god of the hidden dangers of the deep.
 Pontus, primeval god of the sea, father of the fish and other sea creatures.
 Poseidon, Olympian god of the sea and king of the sea gods; also god of flood, drought, earthquakes, and horses. His Roman equivalent is Neptune.
 Potamoi, deities of rivers, fathers of Naiads, brothers of the Oceanids, and as such, the sons of Oceanus and Tethys.
 Proteus, a shape-shifting, prophetic old sea god, and the herdsman of Poseidon's seals.
 Psamathe, goddess of sand beaches.
 Scylla, a sea monster, later authors made up a backstory of her being a Nereid transformed into a monster due to Circe's jealousy.
 The Telchines, sea spirits native to the island of Rhodes; the gods killed them when they turned to evil magic.
 Tethys, Titan goddess of the sources fresh-water, and the mother of the rivers (Potamoi), springs, streams, fountains and clouds.
 Thalassa, primordial goddess of the sea.
 Thaumas, god of the wonders of the sea and father of the Harpies and the rainbow goddess Iris.
 Thetis, leader of the Nereids who presided over the spawning of marine life in the sea, mother of Achilles.
 Triteia, daughter of Triton and companion of Ares.
 Triton, fish-tailed son and herald of Poseidon.
 Tritones, fish-tailed spirits in Poseidon's retinue.
 Aspidochelone, colossal sea monster from the medieval bestiary Physiologus.

 Roman 
Coventina, Romano-British goddess of a sacred spring at Carrawburgh on Hadrian's Wall.
Fontus, god of wells and springs.
Juturna, goddess of fountains, wells, and springs.
Neptune, god-king of the sea. His Greek counterpart was Poseidon.
Salacia, goddess of saltwater. Neptune's consort.
Tiberinus, the genius of the river Tiber.
Volturnus, a god of the Tiber who may originally have been a god of all rivers.

 Anatolian - Hittite 
Aruna, god of the sea.

 Armenian 
Astłik, goddess of water sources.
Tsovinar, goddess of seas and storms.

 Persian Zorostarian 
Ahurani, Ahurani is a water goddess from ancient Persian mythology who watches over rainfall as well as standing water.
Anahita, the divinity of "the Waters" (Aban) and associated with fertility, healing, and wisdom.
Apam Napat, the divinity of rain and the maintainer of order.
Haurvatat, the Amesha Spenta associated with water, prosperity, and health in post-Gathic Zoroastrianism.
Tishtrya, Zoroastrian benevolent divinity associated with life-bringing rainfall and fertility.

 Northwest Eurasia 
 Balto-Slavic 
 Lithuanian 
Bangpūtys, god of sea and storm.
Laumė, goddess of wild spaces, including waters.

 Slavic 
 Kostroma, goddess of fertility. After discovering that her husband, Kupala, is her brother, she jumped into the forest lake (in other legends into the river Ra). After her death, she became a mavka (or rusalka). 
 Mati-syra-zemla, moist mother, also the Earth goddess.
 Mokosh, moistness, lady of waters, goddess of moisture.
 Dodola, goddess of rain.
 Morskoy Tsar, the god and king of the sea.
 Moryana, a giant female sea spirit. 
 Rusalki, female ghosts, water nymphs, succubi or mermaid-like demons that dwell in waterways.
 Veles, god of Earth, waters, and the underworld.
 Vodyanoi, water demon who lived in lakes and rivers.

 Celtic 
Belisama, goddess of lakes and rivers, fire, crafts, and light.
Grannus, a god associated with spas, the sun, fires and healing thermal and mineral springs.
Nantosuelta, river goddess of fire, the earth, healing, and fertility.
Nodens, god associated with healing, the sea, hunting and dogs.
Damona, water goddess associated with healing and rivers
Selkie
Llŷr

 English Folklore 

Father Thames, human manifestation and/or guardian of the River Thames that flows through Southern England, while his ancient worship is obscure, he has become a popular symbol of the river in modern times, it being the subject of the song "Old Father Thames" and the model of several statues and reliefs scattered around London.
Davy Jones, the Devil of the seas in Western piratical lore.

 Gaulish 
Acionna, a water goddess/genius loci of the Orleanais region and the Essonne.
Condatis, god of the River Wear and healing.
 Segeta, goddess of the Loire.
Sequana, goddess of the River Seine.
Souconna, goddess of the Saône.
Sirona, a goddess associated with healing springs.

 Irish 
Brigid, a goddess sometimes associated with water and where three streams join together (relating to her being a Triple Goddess). 
Boann, goddess of the River Boyne.
Danu (Dana), Continental Celtic river goddess. Her Irish variation was an ancestor/mother goddess.
Manannán mac Lir, god of the sea.
Lí Ban, water goddess.
Lir, god of the sea.
Sinann, goddess of the River Shannon.

 Welsh 
Dylan Eil Ton, god of the sea
Llŷr, god of the sea.

 Lusitanian 
 Bandua, theonym associated with fountains.
 Duberdicus, god of the sea and rivers.
 Durius, personification of the Douro river.

 Norse-Germanic 
Ægir, personification of the sea.
Freyr, god of rain, sunlight, fertility, life, and summer.
Nehalennia, goddess of the North Sea.
Nerthus, mostly an earth goddess, but is also associated with lakes, springs, and holy waters.
Nine Daughters of Ægir, who personify the characteristics of waves.
Nix, water spirits who usually appear in human form.
Njord, god of the sea, particularly of seafaring.
Rán, sea goddess of death who collects the drowned in a net, wife of Ægir.
Rhenus Pater, god of the Rhine river
Rura, goddess of the Rur river
Sága, wisdom goddess who lives near water and pours Odin a drink when he visits.
Tiddy Mun, a bog deity once worshiped in Lincolnshire, England who had the ability to control floods.

 Hindu-Vedic 

Ap, group of water goddesses.
Apam Napat, god of fresh water, such as in rivers and lakes.
Danu, goddess of primordial waters, mother of Vritra and the Danavas.
Ganga, goddess of the Ganges river and purity.
Yami, goddess of Yamuna river.
Sarasvati, goddess of knowledge, music and the Sarasvati river.
 Kaveri, celestial nymph, avatar of Parvati, goddess of the Kaveri river.
Tapati, goddess of Tapti river.
Varuna, god of the water and the celestial ocean.
Mariamman, goddess of the rains, medicine, and disease
Makara, mystical creature of waters.

Ossetia
Donbettyr, master of all waters.

 Uralic 
Finnish
Ahti, god of the depths and fish.
Iku-Turso, a malevolent sea monster.
Vedenemo, a goddess of water.
Vellamo,  the wife of Ahti, goddess of the sea, lakes, and storms.

 Asia-Pacific / Oceania 

 Far East Asia 

 Taoism and Chinese folk religion 

Emperor the Water Official (shuǐguān)
Ehuang & Nuying, goddesses of the Xiang River.
Gonggong, red-haired dragon with the head of a man and water god who, together with his associate Xiang Yao, is responsible for the great floods.
Hebo, god of the Yellow River.
Longmu, goddess of the Xijiang River in the Lingnan area.
Mazu, goddess of the sea and protector of seafarers.
Shuimu, goddess of the water.
Shui Wei Niang, goddess of the water. 
 Shuidexianjun (水德星君)
Tam Kung, sea deity worshiped in Hong Kong and Macau with the ability to forecast weather.
Honorable Kings of the Water Immortals (Shuixian Zunwang'').
Han Ao or Lu Ban, the inventors.
 Qu Yuan, Wu Zixu, and Xiang Yu, famous suicides lost in rivers.
 Yu the Great, tamer of China's Great Flood.
Dragon Kings of the Four Seas.
Ao Kuang, Dragon King of the Eastern Sea.
 Ao Qin, Dragon King of the Southern Sea.
 Ao Run, Dragon King of the Western Sea.
 Ao Shun, Dragon King of the Northern Sea.

Japanese 

Ebisu, god of fortunes and fishery, often being referred to marine megafaunas such as whales and whale sharks (hence being also called "Ebisu-shark").
Hanzaki Daimyojin, gigantic Japanese giant salamander and master of the water. 
Kuraokami, one of Suijin.
Mizuchi, Japanese dragon and sea god.
Ōyamatsumi, god of mountains, sea and war.
Ryūjin or Watatsumi, Japanese dragon and tutelary deity of the sea.
Suijin, Shinto god of water.
Sumiyoshi sanjin, god of ocean and sailing.
Susanoo, Shinto god of storms and the sea.
Watatsumi, dragon king and ocean god.
Yamata no Orochi, serpentine monster but also regarded as an incarnation of violent river.

Ainu
Amemasu, monster in the lakes.
Rep-un-kamui, god of the sea, often referring to orca.

Korean 
Imoogi or Imugi, giant serpents of Korean folklore which later become true dragons.
King Munmu, a king who wished to become a dragon before his death to protect Korea from the Sea of Japan (East Sea).
Yongwang, an undersea deity believed to determine the fortunes of fishermen and sailors.

South Asia

Hindu 
In Hindu culture, each water body is worshipped as a form of God. Hence, the rivers are worshipped as goddesses and the ocean is worshipped as a god.

Varuna, the God of the ocean and rains and water.
Indra, King of the Gods, God of weather, and bringer of rain, thunderstorms and clouds.
Saptasindhu, the seven holy rivers of India, namely:
Ganga, the Goddess of the Ganges River.
Yamuna, the Goddess of the Yamuna River.
Saraswati, the divine Goddess of knowledge and wisdom who was personified as a river that dried up in ancient times.
Indus, also called Sindhu. The river is considered the eldest daughter of the Himalaya mountains.
Narmada, the river Goddess often worshipped as a deity and daughter of Lord Shiva.
Godavari, the longest river of South India. The river is also considered as Dakshina Ganga aka South(ern) Ganga.
Kaveri, a river of South India, worshipped by people as a goddess who was previously incarnated as Lopamudra, the wife of Sage Agastya.
Rivers such as Tapi, also known as Tapati, is worshipped as a daughter of the sun god, Surya. 
The river Krishna, worshipped as Krishnaveni Devi/Krishna Mai, is considered to be Lord Vishnu born as a river.
Tungabhadra, a tributary of Krishna, is worshipped as a goddess. The river is also known as Pampa.
Pamba River and Suvarnamukhi River flowing past the holy temple towns of Sabarimala in Kerala and  Tirupati and Srikalahasti in Andhra Pradesh, respectively.
The river Brahmaputra is the only river to have a male personification, whose name means "son of Brahma", the creator.
Mariamman, regional goddess of the rain and medicine

Manipuri 
Wangbren, the Sea God who holds storm, rain and disaster .
Poubi Lai, the giant dragon who ruled its tyranny in the Loktak lake.
Irai Leima, the Goddess of water and aquatic life.

Meitei 
 Irai Leima, goddess of water, sent down to Earth to teach humanity to build a civilisation
 Ngāreima, goddess of fish
 Wangbren, god of the underwater world
 Thongjarok Lairembi of Thongjaorok River
 Iril Lairembi of Iril River
 Imphal Turel Lairembi of Imphal River
 Kongba Turel Lairembi of Kongba River
 Loktak Lairembi of Loktak Lake
 Pumlenpat Lairembi of Pumlenpat Lake

Southeast Asia

Filipino 

Sirinan: the Isnag spirit of the river
Limat: the Gaddang god of the sea
Oden: the Bugkalot deity of the rain, worshiped for its life-giving waters
Ocean Deity: the Ilocano goddess of the ocean whose waters slammed the ediface of salt being built by Ang-ngalo and Asin, causing the sea's water to become salty
Gods of the Pistay Dayat: Pangasinense gods who are pacified through the Pistay Dayat ritual, where offerings are given to the spirits of the waters who pacify the gods
Anitun Tauo: the Sambal goddess of win and rain who was reduced in rank by Malayari for her conceit
Sedsed: the Aeta god of the sea
Apûng Malyari: the Kapampangan moon god who lives in Mt. Pinatubo and ruler of the eight rivers
Lakandanum: variant of the Kapampangan Naga, known to rule the waters
Bathala: the Tagalog supreme god and creator deity, also known as Bathala Maykapal, Lumilikha, and Abba; an enormous being with control over thunder, lightning, flood, fire, thunder, and earthquakes; presides over lesser deities and uses spirits to intercede between divinities and mortals
Anitun Tabu: the Tagalog goddess of wind and rain and daughter of Idianale and Dumangan
Lakapati: the Tagalog hermaphrodite deity and protector of sown fields, sufficient field waters, and abundant fish catch
Amanikable: the Tagalog god of the sea who was spurned by the first mortal woman; also a god of hunters
Amansinaya: the Tagalog goddess of fishermen
Haik: the Tagalog god of the sea who protects travelers from tempests and storms
Bulan-hari: one of the Tagalog deities sent by Bathala to aid the people of Pinak; can command rain to fall; married to Bitu-in
Makapulaw: the Tagalog god of sailors
Great Serpent of Pasig: a giant Tagalog serpent who created the Pasig river after merchants wished to the deity; in exchange for the Pasig's creation, the souls of the merchants would be owned by the serpent
Quadruple Deities: the four childless naked Tau-buid Mangyan deities, composed of two gods who come from the sun and two goddesses who come from the upper part of the river; summoned using the paragayan or diolang plates
Afo Sapa: the Buhid Mangyan owner of rivers
Apu Dandum: the Hanunoo Mangyan spirit living in the water
Tubigan: the Bicolano god of the water
Dagat: the Bicolano goddess of the sea
Bulan: the Bicolano moon god whose arm became the earth, and whose tears became the rivers and seas
Magindang: the Bicolano god of fishing who leads fishermen in getting a good fish catch through sounds and signs
Onos: the Bicolano deity who freed the great flood that changed the land's features
Hamorawan Lady: the Waray deity of the Hamorawan spring in Borongan, who blesses the waters with healing properties
Maka-andog: an epic Waray giant-hero who was friends with the sea spirits and controlled wildlife and fish; first inhabitant and ruler of Samar who lived for five centuries; later immortalized as a deity of fishing
Maguayan: the Bisaya god who rules over the waters as his kingdom; father of Lidagat; brother of Kaptan
Maguyaen: the Bisaya goddess of the winds of the sea
Magauayan: the Bisaya sea deity who fought against Kaptan for eons until Manaul intervened
Lidagat: the Bisaya sea deity married to the wind; daughter of Maguayan
Bakunawa: the Bisaya serpent deity who can coil around the world; sought to swallow the seven "Queen" moons, successfully eating the six, where the last is guarded by bamboos
Makilum-sa-tubig: the Bisaya god of the sea
Kasaray-sarayan-sa-silgan: the Bisaya god of streams
Magdan-durunoon: the Bisaya god of hidden lakes
Santonilyo: a Bisaya deity who brings rain when its image is immersed at sea
Magyawan: the Hiligaynon god of the sea
Manunubo: the Hiligaynon and Aklanon good spirit of the sea
Launsina: the Capiznon goddess of the sun, moon, stars, and seas, and the most beloved because people seek forgiveness from her
Kapapu-an: the Karay-a pantheon of ancestral spirits from whom the supernatural powers of shamans originated from; their aid enables specific types of shamans to gush water from rocks, leap far distances, create oil shields, become invisible, or pass through solid matter
Neguno: the Cuyonon and Agutaynen god of the sea that cursed a selfish man by turning him into the first shark
Polo: the benevolent Tagbanwa god of the sea whose help is invoked during times of illness
Diwata Kat Sidpan: a deity who lives in the western region called Sidpan; controls the rains
Diwata Kat Libatan: a deity who lives in the eastern region called Babatan; controls the rain
Tagma-sa-Dagat: the Subanon god of the sea
Tagma-sa-uba: the Subanon god of the rivers
Diwata na Magbabaya: simply referred as Magbabaya; the good Bukidnon supreme deity and supreme planner who looks like a man; created the earth and the first eight elements, namely bronze, gold, coins, rock, clouds, rain, iron, and water; using the elements, he also created the sea, sky, moon, and stars; also known as the pure god who wills all things; one of three deities living in the realm called Banting
Dadanhayan ha Sugay: the evil Bukidnon lord from whom permission is asked; depicted as the evil deity with a human body and ten heads that continuously drools sticky saliva, which is the source of all waters; one of the three deities living in the realm called Banting
Bulalakaw: the Bukidnon guardian of the water and all the creatures living in it
Python of Pusod Hu Dagat: the gigantic Bukidnon python living at the center of the sea; caused a massive flood when it coiled its body at sea
Bulalakaw: the Talaandig deity who safeguards the creatures in the rivers; the lalayon ritual is offered to the deity
Tagbanua: the Manobo god of rain
Yumud: the god of water
Pamulak Manobo: the Bagobo supreme deity and creator of the world, including the land, sea, and the first humans; throws water from the sky, causing rain, while his spit are the showers
Eels of Mount Apo: two giant Bagobo eels, where one went east and arrived at sea, begetting all the eels of the world; the other went west, and remained on land until it died and became the western foothills of Mount Apo
Fon Eel: the Blaan spirit of water
Fu El: the T;boli spirit of water
Fu El Melel: the T'boli spirit of the river
Segoyong: the Teduray guardians of the classes of natural phenomena; punishes humans to do not show respect and steal their wards; many of them specialize in a class, which can be water, trees, grasses, caves behind waterfalls, land caves, snakes, fire, nunuk trees, deers, and pigs
Tunung: the Maguindanao spirits who live in the sky, water, mountain, or trees; listens to prayers and can converse with humans by borrowing the voice of a medium; protects humans from sickness and crops from pests
Tonong: divine Maranao spirits who often aid heroes; often lives in nonok trees, seas, lakes, and the sky realm
Umboh Tuhan: also called Umboh Dilaut, the Sama-Bajau god of the sea and one of the two supreme deities; married to Dayang Dayang Mangilai
Umboh Kamun: the Sama-Bajau totem of mantis shrimp
Sumangâ: the Sama-Bajau spirit of sea vessels; the guardian who deflects attacks

Indonesian 
Dewi Danu, Balinese Hindu water goddess.
Dewi Lanjar, Javanese Queen of the North Sea.
Nyai Roro Kidul, Javanese Queen of the South Sea (Indian Ocean).

Vietnam 
 Động Đình Quân, Kinh Dương Vương's father-in-law, grandfather of Lạc Long Quân, he was a Long Vương who lived in Dongting Lake.
 Lạc Long Quân, he is the ancestor of the Vietnamese people and is also one of the top Long Vươngs under the Water Palace.
 Bát Hải Long Vương or Vua Cha Bát Hải Động Đình, he is a Long Vương and also the father of Mẫu Thoải. He is the son of Lạc Long Quân and one of the heads of the Water Palace.
 Đông Hải Long Vương, was the 25th son of Lạc Long Quân and Âu Cơ who ruled the whole Bồ Sào region, ruled the Red River, gathered people scattered because of floods to re-explore the hamlets, and kept quiet villages throughout the delta form Ngã ba Hạc to the sea estuary.
 Mẫu Thoải, the head goddess of all rivers, lakes and seas. She governs water and all things related to water.
 Long Vương, the Long Vương is a common name for the gods who rule over the sea and ocean.
 Tô Lịch Giang Thần, god of Tô Lịch River.
 Hà Bá, the god who manages the rivers (note that each river has its own governing god, and each person's power may be less or more powerful than Hà Bá).
 Bà Thủy, goddess has the same function as Hà Bá
 Cá Ông, this god often appears in the form of large fish (such as whales, dolphins, sperm whales,...) to help ships that have accidents due to weather at sea.
 Độc Cước, god of protection for the people of the sea.
 Thuồng Luồng or Giao Long, They can be water monsters, they can also be water gods.

Turkic 
 Talay, god of ocean.

Polynesian

Fijian 
Dakuwaqa, a shark god.
Daucina, god of seafaring.

Hawaiian 
Kamohoalii, shark god.
Kanaloa or Tangaroa, god of the ocean and magics and underworld with forms of cephalopod.
Nāmaka, sea goddess.
Ukupanipo, shark god who controls the amount of fish close enough for the fisherman to catch.

Māori 
Ikatere, a fish god, the father of all the sea creatures including mermaids.
Kiwa, a guardian of the sea.
Rongomai, a whale god.
Ruahine, an eel god.
Taniwha, deities or monsters (often take forms resembling dragons).
Tangaroa, god of the sea.
Tawhirimātea, god of the weather, rain, storms and wind
Tinirau, a guardian of the sea.
Tohora (Maori name for southern right whales), the great whale who saved legendary hero Paikea, famously known as the Whale Rider, (also the Maori name for humpback whales) from drowning and carried him to land. This led to the creation of New Zealand.

Samoan

other island nations 
Agunua, serpentine god of the sea of Solomon Islands.
Ayida-Weddo, serpentine spirit among several island nations.

Cook Islands
Tangaroa, God of the Ocean and Seas
Momoke, fair maidens, said to be water spirits with skin as pale as milk. These 'white ones' approach those on land during the night, emerging from deep pools of water to collect food or to seduce men before returning to the water depths. It is said that the Momoke come from an underwater nation, though some have said that this watery kingdom is also 'Avaiki'; paradise, heaven and the source of all of creation.

Australia 
Eingana, mother of all.
Rainbow Serpents, creators of dreamtime.
Ungud, serpent god bring fortunes.
Wirnpa, creator of rain.
Yurlungur, the copper serpent.

Native Americas

North America

Inuit 
Aipaloovik, an evil sea god associated with death and destruction.
Alignak, a lunar deity and god of weather, water, tides, eclipses, and earthquakes.
Arnapkapfaaluk, a fearsome sea goddess.
Idliragijenget, god of the ocean.
Kanajuk, the scorpionfish god and husband of the goddesses Nuliajuk and Isarraitaitsoq.
Nootaikok, god who presided over icebergs and glaciers.
Nuliajuk and Isarraitaitsoq, goddesses of the sea's depths and its creatures among the Netsilik Inuit.
Sedna, goddess of the sea and its creatures.

Central America and the Caribbean

Mexica 
 Atlaua, god of water, archers, and fishermen.
 Chalchiuhtlicue,  goddess of water, lakes, rivers, seas, streams, horizontal waters, storms, and baptism.
 Opochtli, god of fishing and birdcatchers.
 Tlāloc, god of water, fertility, and rain.
 Tlaloque, a group of rain, water, and mountain gods.

Ewe / Fon 
Agwé, a sea loa.
Clermeil, a river loa.
Mami Wata, a water loa.
Pie, a lake and river loa.

Mayan 
Chaac, god of rain.
Kukulcan, god of the seas, oceans, and storms

Taíno 
 Atabey (goddess), Mother goddess of fresh water and fertility. Female counterpart of the god Yúcahu.

South America

Tupi-Guarani (Brazilian Myth) 
Amanasy, Goddess of the rain and frogs
Iara, Guardian of the water and of the Amazon River
Ipupiara, Guardian of the sea
Luruaçu, Goddess of the storms
Tupã, God of the thunder, weather, storms and clouds

Incan 
Pariacaca, god of water and rainstorms.
Paricia, god who sent a flood to kill humans who did not respect him adequately.

Panche/Muisca 
Mohan, a mischievous entity associated with rivers, lakes and water in general.

See also

 Holy wells
 Nadi (yoga)
 Nature worship
 Sea monster
 Water chakra
 Water spirit

References

Water deities